Established in 1998, the Kellogg-HKUST Executive MBA Program (KHEMBA) is a program run in partnership of the Kellogg School of Management at Northwestern University and The Hong Kong University of Science and Technology. It has been ranked No.1 in the World eleven times by the Financial Times since 2005.

Program Overview
The KHEMBA program is an 18-month part-time program taught by the faculty and lecturers from Kellogg and HKUST. Upon successful completion, participants are awarded one Master of Business Administration degree issued jointly by both universities.

Students
The student profile of the recent KHEMBA class of 2023 is made up of 42 students with 32% female. The average age of students is 42 years old and the average years of work experience is 18. Participants and faculty have diverse backgrounds, representing 16 nationalities in 17 cities.

Ranking
The Kellogg-HKUST Executive MBA Program is widely recognized as a prestigious EMBA program. It has been ranked No.1 eleven times by the Financial Times since 2005.

Faculty and Lecturers
The program is taught by faculty from both HKUST Business School and Kellogg School of Management, notable lecturers include:

Alexander Chernev
Sunil Chopra
Vidhan K. Goyal
Harry Kraemer
Milind Rao
Mohanbir Sawhney
Karl Schmedders
David Schonthal
Kay Stice

Notable alumni
Victor Herrero, Executive Chairman and CEO of Clarks
Leon Jakimič, Founder and Owner of Lasvit

See also
HKUST
Business School
Kellogg School of Management

References

External links
 Kellogg-HKUST Executive MBA Program
 HKUST School of Business and Management website
 Kellogg School of Management at Northwestern University website
 HKUST website
 Northwestern University website

Master's degrees
Hong Kong University of Science and Technology
1998 establishments in Hong Kong